Nick Lashaway (March 24, 1988 – May 8, 2016) was an American actor.

He was best known for his roles on The X-Files, Girls, and The 40-Year-Old Virgin. He appeared in The Last Song opposite Miley Cyrus, portraying the leader of a gang of thugs who hustle money from beach carnival crowds through spectacular fire-juggling performances. He played Brandon O'Neil in Wes Craven's 2010 film My Soul to Take, opposite Max Thieriot.

Death
Lashaway died in a three-car crash on May 8, 2016 in Framingham, Massachusetts.

Filmography

References

External links

Notice of death of Lashaway in Framingham, Massachusetts

1988 births
2016 deaths
Male actors from Washington, D.C.
21st-century American male actors
20th-century American male actors
American male television actors
American male film actors
Road incident deaths in Massachusetts